MILMEGA is a company specializing in designing and manufacturing high-power amplifiers for electromagnetic compatibility (EMC) testing.

History 

Founded in 1987 by Dr John Yelland, MILMEGA's first design was a contract to deliver a narrow-band amplifier to meet the requirements of a medical product used in the treatment of prostate cancer.

MILMEGA went onto design and manufacture high-power amplifiers for commercial and government applications.

Milmega was first sold in 1997 to an american company.  

In 2004, the company was acquired by its management team in a management buyout (MBO) in part financed by venture capital funding from South East Growth Fund.

Since the MBO the company has invested in the field of wide bandgap transistor technologies, specifically, silicon carbide transistor (SiC) and gallium nitride transistor (GaN) technologies.

In 2010, the company centralized its operations at the current factory at Ryde, on the Isle of Wight, and in the same year, launched its Chinese language website.

In February 2012, MILMEGA was purchased by Teseq Holding AG..

In April 2012, MILMEGA received the Queen's Awards for Enterprise for their 80 MHz to 1 GHz range of amplifier.

In January 2014, the Teseq Group was purchased by AMETEK Inc..

Today, MILMEGA's workforce consists of 35 design and production staff.

References 

Companies based on the Isle of Wight
Electrical engineering companies of the United Kingdom